In Greek mythology, Erginus  was a king of Minyan Orchomenus in Boeotia.

Family 
Erginus was the son of Clymenus or Periclymenus, his predecessor, and Buzyge (or Budeia) and his brothers were Arrhon, Azeus, Pyleus, Stratius, Eurydice and Axia. In one account, his father was instead Azeus. Some authors identify him with another Erginus, a Milesian Argonaut.

Mythology 
Erginus avenged his father's death at the hands of Perieres, charioteer of Menoeceus of Thebes; he made war against Thebans, inflicting a heavy defeat. The Thebans were compelled to pay King Erginus a tribute of 100 oxen per year for twenty years.  However, the tribute ended earlier than Erginus expected, when Heracles attacked the Minyan emissaries sent to exact the tribute. This prompted a second war between Orchomenus and Thebes, only this time Thebes (under the leadership of Heracles) was victorious, and a double tribute was imposed on the Orchomenians. Erginus was slain in battle according to the version of the story given by most ancient writers (e.g., the Bibliotheca, Strabo, Eustathius). But according to Pausanias, Erginus was spared by Heracles and lived to a ripe old age, and even fathered two sons, Trophonius and Agamedes, on a younger woman.

Notes

References 

 Apollodorus, The Library with an English Translation by Sir James George Frazer, F.B.A., F.R.S. in 2 Volumes, Cambridge, MA, Harvard University Press; London, William Heinemann Ltd. 1921. ISBN 0-674-99135-4. Online version at the Perseus Digital Library. Greek text available from the same website.
 Diodorus Siculus, The Library of History translated by Charles Henry Oldfather. Twelve volumes. Loeb Classical Library. Cambridge, Massachusetts: Harvard University Press; London: William Heinemann, Ltd. 1989. Vol. 3. Books 4.59–8. Online version at Bill Thayer's Web Site
 Diodorus Siculus, Bibliotheca Historica. Vol 1-2. Immanel Bekker. Ludwig Dindorf. Friedrich Vogel. in aedibus B. G. Teubneri. Leipzig. 1888–1890. Greek text available at the Perseus Digital Library.
 Homer, The Odyssey with an English Translation by A.T. Murray, Ph.D. in two volumes. Cambridge, MA., Harvard University Press; London, William Heinemann, Ltd. 1919. . Online version at the Perseus Digital Library. Greek text available from the same website.
 Pausanias, Description of Greece with an English Translation by W.H.S. Jones, Litt.D., and H.A. Ormerod, M.A., in 4 Volumes. Cambridge, MA, Harvard University Press; London, William Heinemann Ltd. 1918. . Online version at the Perseus Digital Library
 Pausanias, Graeciae Descriptio. 3 vols. Leipzig, Teubner. 1903.  Greek text available at the Perseus Digital Library.
 Pindar, Odes translated by Diane Arnson Svarlien. 1990. Online version at the Perseus Digital Library.
 Pindar, The Odes of Pindar including the Principal Fragments with an Introduction and an English Translation by Sir John Sandys, Litt.D., FBA. Cambridge, MA., Harvard University Press; London, William Heinemann Ltd. 1937. Greek text available at the Perseus Digital Library.
 Stephanus of Byzantium, Stephani Byzantii Ethnicorum quae supersunt, edited by August Meineike (1790-1870), published 1849. A few entries from this important ancient handbook of place names have been translated by Brady Kiesling. Online version at the Topos Text Project.
 Strabo, The Geography of Strabo. Edition by H.L. Jones. Cambridge, Mass.: Harvard University Press; London: William Heinemann, Ltd. 1924. Online version at the Perseus Digital Library.
 Strabo, Geographica edited by A. Meineke. Leipzig: Teubner. 1877. Greek text available at the Perseus Digital Library.
 The Homeric Hymns and Homerica with an English Translation by Hugh G. Evelyn-White. Homeric Hymns. Cambridge, MA.,Harvard University Press; London, William Heinemann Ltd. 1914. Online version at the Perseus Digital Library. Greek text available from the same website.

Further reading 
 William Smith. A Dictionary of Greek and Roman biography and mythology. s.v. Erginus. London (1848). 

Princes in Greek mythology
Kings of Minyan Orchomenus
Kings in Greek mythology
Minyan characters in Greek mythology
Mythology of Heracles